Tomás Leonardi (born 7 January 1987 in Buenos Aires, Argentina) is an Argentine rugby union footballer. He is currently unattached to a club.

Club Rugby

He joined the South African team  for the 2013 Super Rugby season.

He left the Kings in July 2013 and, after a few appearances for former side S.I.C. in the Torneo de la URBA in Argentina, he moved to Scotland to join Edinburgh Rugby.

Leonardi was signed for the new Japanese Super Rugby team Sunwolves for the 2016 season but was later announced in the Leicester Tigers European cup squad in October 2016 as a temporary injury replacement for Mike Williams. Leonardi played part of the Anglo-Welsh Cup game against Bath in November 2016. Leonardi wasn't announced in the squad for the rest of the 2016/17 season. As of May 2017, Leonardi isn't recognised in the Tigers' squad list.

International
In May 2010, he was selected in a squad of over 40 players to represent Argentina in the two-test Summer tour of Europe. He has been a regular international for Argentina ever since.

See also
 2009 end of year rugby tests
 List of Argentina national rugby union players

References

1987 births
Living people
Argentine rugby union players
Argentina international rugby union players
San Isidro Club rugby union players
Pampas XV players
Rugby union flankers
Rugby union players from Buenos Aires
Southern Kings players
Argentine expatriate rugby union players
Expatriate rugby union players in South Africa
Argentine expatriate sportspeople in South Africa
Edinburgh Rugby players
Expatriate rugby union players in Scotland
Argentine expatriate sportspeople in Scotland
Stade Toulousain players
Expatriate rugby union players in France
Argentine expatriate sportspeople in France
Sunwolves players
Expatriate rugby union players in Japan
Argentine expatriate sportspeople in Japan
Leicester Tigers players
Argentine expatriate sportspeople in England